The 1975 USLTA-IPA Indoor Circuit  was a professional tennis circuit held in the United States from January until April that year. It was the fifth edition of the circuit and consisted of 11 tournaments. Tennis promotor Bill Riordan organized the circuit and it was sanctioned by the United States Lawn Tennis Association (USLTA). The circuit had a bonus pool of $100,000 for the top eight players.

Schedule

January

February

March

See also
 1975 Grand Prix circuit
 1975 World Championship Tennis circuit

References

External links
 1975 ATP tournament schedule

USLTA Indoor Circuit
USLTA Indoor Circuit
USLTA Indoor Circuit seasons